Edward Fairhurst (born May 7, 1979) is a former Canadian international rugby union player.

Fairhurst played primarily as a scrum half throughout his career making his debut for the Canada national team in May 2001. He was subsequently selected to the national squad for the 2003 Rugby World Cup in Australia, the 2007 Rugby World Cup in France and the 2011 Rugby World Cup. in New Zealand.

From 2001 - 2005 Fairhurst was a member of the national Seven-a-Side rugby team competing in 15 tournaments on the IRB Seven's World Series. In 2005 he was selected to the 2005 Seven-a-Side Rugby World Cup in Hong Kong.

In 2006 Fairhurst signed with the Cardiff Blues from the University of Victoria in British Columbia. He would play a year at Cardiff before moving to the south-west of England to play for the Cornish Pirates for the 2007–08 and 2008-09 seasons.

In 2009, Fairhurst joined RBC Dominion Securities in Vancouver, British Columbia. Edward holds both Chartered Investment Manager (CIM) and Certified Financial Planning (CFP) designations along with Securities, Options, Derivatives and Insurance (LLQP) licenses and is a Fellow of the Canadian Securities Institute (FCSI).

In October 2012, Fairhurst announced his retirement from international rugby with 57 international appearances; the most by any Canadian scrum-half.

Notes

1979 births
Living people
Canadian rugby union players
Cardiff Rugby players
Sportspeople from Regina, Saskatchewan
Canadian expatriate sportspeople in Wales
Canada international rugby union players
Canada international rugby sevens players
Male rugby sevens players
Canadian expatriate sportspeople in England
Canadian expatriate rugby union players
Expatriate rugby union players in England
Expatriate rugby union players in Wales
Rugby union scrum-halves